Sander Arends and David Pel were the defending champions but chose not to defend their title.

Robert Galloway and Alex Lawson won the title after defeating JC Aragone and Nicolás Barrientos 7–6(10–8), 6–4 in the final.

Seeds

Draw

References

External links
 Main draw

Open Castilla y León - Doubles
2021 Doubles
2021 Open Castilla y León